Payus is a rural locality (a village) in Chushevitskoye Rural Settlement, Verkhovazhsky District, Vologda Oblast, Russia. The population was 310 as of 2002. There are 5 streets.

Geography 
Payus is located 41 km southwest of Verkhovazhye (the district's administrative centre) by road. Shchekino is the nearest rural locality.

References 

Rural localities in Verkhovazhsky District